Lettuce virus X (LeVX) is a plant virus that has been found infecting lettuce in the Tehran province of Iran. Infection is not known to cause symptoms.

References

Potexviruses
Viral plant pathogens and diseases